St. Cuthbert of Lindisfarne was an Anglo-Saxon saint, bishop, monk and hermit.

Cuthbert may also refer to:

Places in the United States:
Cuthbert, Georgia, a city
Cuthbert, South Dakota, an unincorporated community
Cuthbert, Texas, a ghost town

People:
Cuthbert (given name)
Cuthbert (surname)

Other uses:
Cuthbert, Western Australia, Australia, see List of heritage places in the City of Albany
Cuthbert School, a one-room schoolhouse, later a high school, in Randolph County, Georgia
"Cuthbert", World War II Allied spy Virginia Hall's nickname for her prosthetic leg

See also
St Cuthbert (disambiguation)
Cuthberts Building, Johannesburg, South Africa